Elections to the New York State Assembly were held on November 6, 2018 along with elections for the State Senate, Governor, and U.S. Senator, among others. The Democrats retained their majority with no net change in seats from 2016. Eight seats changed hands, four from Republican to Democrat and four from Democrat to Republican.

Overview

Results

Detailed results

Notes

References

2018 New York (state) elections
New York State Assembly
New York State Assembly elections